Llewellyn Herbert (born 21 July 1977 in Bethal) is a South African athlete competing over 400 metres hurdles. He won an Olympic bronze medal in 2000 and set five national records over the distance.

Achievements

Affiliations
 TuksSport – University of Pretoria, South Africa

References

External links
 

1977 births
Living people
People from Bethal
South African male hurdlers
Athletes (track and field) at the 1996 Summer Olympics
Athletes (track and field) at the 2000 Summer Olympics
Athletes (track and field) at the 2004 Summer Olympics
Olympic athletes of South Africa
Medalists at the 2000 Summer Olympics
University of Pretoria alumni
World Athletics Championships medalists
World Athletics Championships athletes for South Africa
Olympic bronze medalists for South Africa
Olympic bronze medalists in athletics (track and field)
Universiade medalists in athletics (track and field)
Goodwill Games medalists in athletics
Universiade gold medalists for South Africa
Medalists at the 1997 Summer Universiade
Competitors at the 2001 Goodwill Games
20th-century South African people
21st-century South African people